Jurij Medveděv (born 18 June 1996) is a professional footballer who plays for Slovan Bratislava in the Fortuna Liga as a right back. Born in Kazakhstan, he has represented the Czech Republic at youth level.

Club career
Medveděv was born in Badamsha, Kazakhstan. When he was 3 year old, he moved with his family to Czech Republic.

FK Senica
Medveděv made his Fortuna Liga debut for Senica against AS Trenčín on 23 July 2017.

International career
Being born in Kazakhstan from an ethnic Russian family and having lived in the Czech Republic since three, Jurij is available to represent the Czech Republic, Kazakhstan and Russia.

Honours
Slovan Bratislava
Fortuna Liga (4): 2018–19, 2019–20, 2020–21, 2021–22  
Slovnaft Cup (2): 2019–20, 2020–21

References

External links
 FK Senica official club profile
 
 Futbalnet profile

1996 births
Living people
People from Kargaly District
Czech people of Russian descent
Kazakhstani emigrants to the Czech Republic
Czech footballers
Czech expatriate footballers
Czech Republic youth international footballers
Association football defenders
FC Viktoria Plzeň players
FK Baník Sokolov players
FK Senica players
ŠK Slovan Bratislava players
Czech National Football League players
Slovak Super Liga players
Expatriate footballers in Slovakia
Czech expatriate sportspeople in Slovakia